Courts of Minnesota include:
;State courts of Minnesota
Minnesota Supreme Court
Minnesota Court of Appeals
Minnesota District Courts (10 districts)
Minnesota Tax Court
Minnesota Workers' Compensation Court of Appeals

Federal courts located in Minnesota
United States District Court for the District of Minnesota

References

External links
National Center for State Courts – directory of state court websites.

Courts in the United States